The ochraceous wren (Troglodytes ochraceus) is a small songbird of the wren family. It is a resident breeding species in Costa Rica, Panama, and Colombia.

Taxonomy and systematics

The ochraceous wren was previously considered to be a subspecies of mountain wren (Troglodytes solstitialis). The International Ornithological Committee (IOC) recognizes two subspecies, the nominate Troglodytes ochraceus ochraceus and T. o. festinus. The Cornell Lab of Ornithology's Birds of the World and the Clements taxonomy split T. o. ligea from the nominate subspecies.

Description

The nominate subspecies sensu stricto has a rich medium brown crown and back with a rufous cast to the rump. The tail is brown with blackish bars. It has a bold yellowish buff supercilium that extends to the nape. Its chin, throat, and upper chest are buffy brown, its lower breast and upper belly buffy white, and its flanks and lower belly darker buffy brown. T. o. ligea, when treated separately, is duller than the nominate and has a heavier bill. T. o. festinus is smaller and lighter below than the nominate and also has a larger bill.

Distribution and habitat

According to the IOC, the nominate subspecies of ochraceous wren is found in the Costa Rica highlands from the Tilarán Mountains to the Talamanca ranges and in western and central Panama. Cornell and Clements treat the Panamanian population as T. o. ligea and confine T. o. ochraceus to Costa Rica. All three place T. o. festinus in eastern Panama; Cornell, Clements, and the South American Classification Committee of the American Ornithological Society (SACC/AOS) note its occurrence in adjacent northwestern Colombia as well.

The ochraceous wren primarily inhabits wet epiphyte-laden montane forest, and also semi-open areas such as woodland edges, tall second growth, and pastures with trees.

Behavior

Feeding

The ochraceous wren mostly forages on mossy tree trunks and in epiphytes. Its prey is small invertebrates.

Breeding

The ochraceous wren's nesting period apparently spans from April to July in Costa Rica. Families of two adults and two young have been observered.

Vocalization

The ochraceous wren's song is "a rather subdued medley of varied liquid trills and high, thin slurred whistles" and it calls "a rolling, thin high-pitched 'peeer' or 'peeew' and low, weak 'churr'."

Status

The IUCN has assessed the ochraceous wren as being of Least Concern. Though its population has not been quantified, it is believed to be fairly common, and it occurs in several national parks and biological reserves.

References

ochraceous wren
Birds of the Talamancan montane forests
ochraceous wren
Taxa named by Robert Ridgway